Gerda Holmes, née Gerda Helen Elfrida Henius (April 2, 1891 – October 11, 1943),  was an actress during the silent film era and in theater. She had major roles in numerous films including The Fable of Elvira and Farina and the Meal Ticket (1915) and The Iron Ring (1917) with Arthur Ashley.

Holmes was Danish Her grandfather managed the Royal Danish Theatre in Copenhagen for more than two decades, and her father was a doctor in Chicago. She studied music in Denmark and began performing on stage there at about age 14. Her first marriage was to Rapley Holmes.

The cover of the December 1916 issue of The Masses magazine featured a "stylish and very modern" portrait of Holmes by Frank Walts.

Selected filmography
The Family Honor (1917)

References

American silent film actresses
20th-century American actresses
American film actresses
1891 births
1943 deaths